Princess Abbhantripaja of Siam (RTGS: Apphantripracha; official title: Phra Chao Boromwongse Ther Phra Ong Chao Abbhantripaja; 31 October 1889 – 18 February 1934), was a Princess of Siam (later Thailand). She was a member of Siamese royal family. She was a daughter of Chulalongkorn, King Rama V of Siam. 

Her mother was The Noble Consort (Chao Chom Manda) Sae Rojanadis, daughter of Phraya Abbhantrikamas and Bang Rojanadis. She had 2 siblings; elder brother and younger sister;
 Prince Khajera Chirapradidha (23 July 1888 – 7 October 1888)
 Princess Dibyalangkarn (17 January 1891 – 4 June 1932)

Princess Abbhantripaja is nicknamed "Khao" which means 'white' in Thai, due to her fair skin. She was regarded as one of King Rama V's most beautiful daughters, alongside her elder half-sister Princess Suddha Dibyaratana (Princess Suthathip). She was described by those who had seen her as taller than average, gentle and often smiling.

Well-educated and fluent in English, the princess cared deeply about education. She founded an all girls' school named Abbhantri Padung (or Kattiyanee Padung) school, which educated young girls, particularly the princess' own ladies-in-waiting and girls from noble or bourgeois families. She gave her old residence to be used as the school building and moved to a smaller house, in which she later died.

Princess Abbhantripaja died on 18 February 1934, at the age of 44 from influenza and complications from kidney disease.

Ancestry

1889 births
1934 deaths
19th-century Chakri dynasty
19th-century Thai women
19th-century Thai people
20th-century Chakri dynasty
20th-century Thai women
20th-century Thai people
Thai female Phra Ong Chao
Dames Grand Commander of the Order of Chula Chom Klao
Children of Chulalongkorn
Deaths from influenza
Deaths from kidney disease
Infectious disease deaths in Thailand
Daughters of kings